Teja Singh Dardi (died 27 April 1998) was an Indian politician. He was a Member of Parliament, representing Bathinda, Punjab in the Lok Sabha the lower house of India's Parliament as a member of the Akali Dal.

References

Lok Sabha members from Punjab, India
India MPs 1984–1989
1998 deaths
Year of birth missing
Shiromani Akali Dal politicians